Palumbia bellieri is a species of hoverfly in the family Syrphidae.

Distribution
Italy.

References

Eristalinae
Insects described in 1860
Diptera of Europe
Taxa named by Jacques-Marie-Frangile Bigot